The Salvator Mile Stakes (formerly the Salvator Mile Handicap) is an American Thoroughbred horse race held annually in June or July at Monmouth Park Racetrack in Oceanport, New Jersey. Open to horses age three and older, it is contested on dirt at a distance of one mile (8 furlongs). A Grade III event, it currently offers a purse of $100,000. This race is named for U.S. Racing Hall of Fame inductee, Salvator.

The Salvator Mile (G3) is the lead off leg of the Mid Atlantic Thoroughbred Championships Long Dirt Division or MATCh Races.  MATCh is a series of five races in five separate thoroughbred divisions run throughout four Mid-Atlantic States including; Pimlico Race Course and Laurel Park Racecourse in Maryland; Delaware Park Racetrack in Delaware; Parx, Philadelphia Park and Presque Isle Downs in Pennsylvania and Monmouth Park in New Jersey.

Records
Speed record:
 1:34.25 – Gottcha Gold (2007)

Most wins:
 2 – Peanut Butter Onit (1991, 1992)
 2 – Sea of Tranquility (2001, 2002)

Most wins by a jockey:
 4 – Bill Hartack (1954, 1959, 1960, 1970)

Most wins by a trainer:
 3 – Frank Y. Whiteley Jr. (1966, 1970, 1974)

Most wins by an owner:
 2 – Brookfield Farm (1949, 1964)
 2 – Jaclyn Stable (1954, 1959)
 2 – Keystone Stable (1969, 1977)
 2 – Elaine J. Meltzer (1991, 1992)
 2 – Triple M Farm, Inc. (2001, 2002)

Winners

 † In 2002, First Lieutenant finished first but was disqualified and set back to third.
 † In 1979, Nice Catch finished first but was disqualified and set back to third.

References

External links
 The 2008 Salvator Mile at the NTRA

Graded stakes races in the United States
Open mile category horse races
Horse races in New Jersey
Monmouth Park Racetrack
Recurring sporting events established in 1948
1948 establishments in New Jersey